Huangshan District is a district of Huangshan City, Anhui province, People's Republic of China. The government of Huangshan District is located in Jintai Town. The renowned Huangshan Mountain is located within the district.

Huangshan District has jurisdiction over six towns and eight townships.

Administrative divisions
Huangshan District is divided to 1 Subdistrict, 9 towns and 5 townships.
Subdistricts
Xincheng Subdistrict

Towns

Townships

Climate

References

External links
  Yin Yu Tang: A Chinese Home  provides a detailed look at life within the Huangshan District through the examination of a Huang family residence built during the late Qing dynasty and occupied for over 200 years.

County-level divisions of Anhui
Huangshan City